Manchester United F.C. (MUFC) is an association football club in Manchester, England

MUFC may also refer to:

Association football clubs
Madura United F.C., Indonesia
Mahindra United F.C., India
Maidenhead United F.C., England
Maidstone United F.C., England
Maidstone United F.C. (1897), predecessor of the current club
Malahide United F.C., Ireland
Mallow United F.C., Ireland
Manchester 62 F.C., Gibraltar, formerly "Manchester United F.C." in their honour
Manly United FC, Australia
Maritzburg United F.C., South Africa
Mathare United F.C., Kenya
Melaka United F.C., Malaysia
Minnesota United FC, United States
 Mitsubishi Urawa F.C., a former name of Urawa Red Diamonds, Japan 
Monaghan United F.C., Ireland
Muangthong United F.C., Thailand

Australian rules football clubs
Melbourne University Football Club, Victoria, Australia

Other uses
Mandela United Football Club, Winnie Mandela's protection detail in the late 1980s
Maritime Underwater Future Capability, a Royal Navy project

See also
Manchester United F.C. Reserves and Academy, the reserves and academy of Manchester United Football Club